John Fitzpatrick (26 June 1889 – 16 August 1952) was an Australian cricketer. He played one first-class cricket match for Victoria in 1914.

See also
 List of Victoria first-class cricketers

References

External links
 

1889 births
1952 deaths
Australian cricketers
Victoria cricketers
Cricketers from Sydney